This is a round-up of the 2008 Sligo Senior Football Championship. Eastern Harps were crowned champions for the sixth time in their history, after a convincing defeat of Tubbercurry in the decider. The reigning champions, Tourlestrane, surrendered the title after failing to emerge from their group, and the once-dominant town outfit, St. Mary's, were forced to survive a playoff to retain their senior status. The 2000 champions Bunninadden were not so fortunate however, and were relegated to Intermediate level, just two years after last contesting the final.

Group stages

The Championship was contested by 16 teams, divided into four groups. The top two sides in each group advanced to the quarter-finals, with the bottom sides in each group facing the Relegation playoffs to retain Senior status for 2009, as the restructuring of the Championships got under way.

Group A

Group B

Group C

Group D

Quarterfinals

Semifinals

Last eight

Sligo Senior Football Championship Final

Relegation

References

 Sligo Champion (Summer/Autumn 2008)
 Sligo Weekender (Summer/Autumn 2008)

Sligo Senior Football Championship
Sligo Senior Football Championship